Laurel Philips Anderson (born June 5, 1947), known as Laurie Anderson, is an American avant-garde artist, composer, musician, and film director whose work spans performance art, pop music, and multimedia projects. Initially trained in violin and sculpting, Anderson pursued a variety of performance art projects in New York during the 1970s,  focusing particularly on language, technology, and visual imagery. She became more widely known outside the art world when her single "O Superman" reached number two on the UK singles chart in 1981. Her debut album Big Science was released the following year. She also starred in and directed the 1986 concert film Home of the Brave.

Anderson is a pioneer in electronic music and has invented several devices that she has used in her recordings and performance art shows. In 1977, she created a tape-bow violin that uses recorded magnetic tape on the bow instead of horsehair and a magnetic tape head in the bridge. In the late 1990s, she collaborated with Interval Research to develop an instrument she called a "talking stick," a six-foot-long (1.8 m) baton-like MIDI controller that can access and replicate sounds.

Anderson met singer-songwriter Lou Reed in 1992, and she was married to him from April 2008 until his death in 2013.

Early life and education 
Anderson was born in Glen Ellyn, Illinois, on June 5, 1947, the daughter of Mary Louise (née Rowland) and Arthur T. Anderson. She had seven siblings, and on weekends she studied painting at the Art Institute of Chicago and played with the Chicago Youth Symphony.

She graduated from Glenbard West High School. She attended Mills College in California, and after moving to New York in 1966, graduated in 1969 from Barnard College with a B.A. magna cum laude and Phi Beta Kappa, studying art history. In 1972, she obtained an M.F.A. in sculpture from Columbia University.

Her first performance-art piece — a symphony played on automobile horns — was performed in 1969. In 1970, she drew the underground comix Baloney Moccasins, which was published by George DiCaprio. In the early 1970s, she worked as an art instructor, as an art critic for magazines such as Artforum, and illustrated children's books—the first of which was titled The Package, a mystery story in pictures alone.

Career

1970s 
Anderson performed in New York during the 1970s.  One of her most-cited performances, Duets on Ice, which she conducted in New York and other cities around the world, involved her playing the violin along with a recording while wearing ice skates with the blades frozen into a block of ice; the performance ended only when the ice had melted away. Two early pieces, "New York Social Life" and "Time to Go," are included in the 1977 compilation New Music for Electronic and Recorded Media, along with works by Pauline Oliveros and others. Two other pieces were included on Airwaves, a collection of audio pieces by various artists. She also recorded a lecture for Vision, a set of artist's lectures released by Crown Point Press as a set of six LPs.

Many of Anderson's earliest recordings remain unreleased or were issued only in limited quantities, such as her first single, "It's Not the Bullet that Kills You (It's the Hole)." That song, along with "New York Social Life" and about a dozen others, was originally recorded for use in an art installation that consisted of a jukebox that played the different Anderson compositions, at the Holly Solomon Gallery in New York City. Among the musicians on these early recordings are Peter Gordon on saxophone, Scott Johnson on guitar, Ken Deifik on harmonica, and Joe Kos on drums. Photographs and descriptions of many of these early performances were included in Anderson's retrospective book Stories from the Nerve Bible.

During the late 1970s, Anderson made a number of additional recordings that were either released privately or included on compilations of avant-garde music, most notably releases by the Giorno Poetry Systems label run by New York poet John Giorno, an early intimate of Andy Warhol. In 1978, she performed at the Nova Convention, a major conference involving many counter-culture figures and rising avant-garde musical stars, including William S. Burroughs, Philip Glass, Frank Zappa, Timothy Leary, Malcolm Goldstein, John Cage, and Allen Ginsberg. She also worked with comedian Andy Kaufman in the late 1970s.

1980s 
In 1980, Anderson was awarded an honorary doctorate from the San Francisco Art Institute. In 1982, she was awarded a Guggenheim Fellowship for Creative Arts—Film. In 1987, Anderson was awarded an honorary doctorate in the fine arts from the University of the Arts in Philadelphia.

Anderson became widely known outside the art world in 1981 with the single "O Superman," originally released in a limited quantity by B. George's One Ten Records, which ultimately reached number two on the British charts. The sudden influx of orders from the UK (prompted partly by British station BBC Radio 1 playlisting the record) led to Anderson signing a seven-album deal with Warner Bros. Records, which re-released the single.

"O Superman" was part of a larger stage work titled United States and was included on the album Big Science. Prior to the release of Big Science, Anderson returned to Giorno Poetry Systems to record the album You're the Guy I Want to Share My Money With; Anderson recorded one side of the double-LP set, with William S. Burroughs and John Giorno recording a side each, and the fourth side featured a separate groove for each artist. This was followed by the back-to-back releases of her albums Mister Heartbreak and United States Live, the latter of which was a five-LP (and, later, four-CD) recording of her two-evening stage show at the Brooklyn Academy of Music. She also appeared in a television special produced by Nam June Paik broadcast on New Year's Day 1984, titled "Good Morning, Mr. Orwell."

She next starred in and directed the 1986 concert film Home of the Brave and also composed the soundtracks for the Spalding Gray films Swimming to Cambodia and Monster in a Box.  During this time, she also contributed music to Robert Wilson's Alcestis at the American Repertory Theater in Cambridge, Massachusetts. She also hosted the PBS series Alive from Off Center during 1987, after having produced the short film What You Mean We? for the series the year before. What You Mean We? introduced a new character played by Anderson: "The Clone," a digitally altered masculine counterpart to Anderson who later "co-hosted" with her when she did her presenting stint on Alive from Off Center. Elements of The Clone were later incorporated into the titular "puppet" of her later work, Puppet Motel. In that year, she also appeared on Peter Gabriel's album So, in the song "This is the Picture (Excellent Birds)."

Release of Anderson's first post-Home of the Brave album, 1989's Strange Angels, was delayed for more than a year in order for Anderson to take singing lessons. This was due to the album being more musically inclined (in terms of singing) than her previous works. The single "Babydoll" was a moderate hit on the Modern Rock Charts in 1989.

1990s 
In 1991, she was a member of the jury at the 41st Berlin International Film Festival. In the same year, Anderson appeared in The Human Face, a feature arts documentary directed by artist-filmmakers Nichola Bruce and Michael Coulson for BBC television. Anderson was the presenter in this documentary on the history of the face in art and science. Her face was transformed using latex masks and digital special effects as she introduced ideas about the relationship between physiognomy and perception. Her varied career in the early 1990s included voice-acting in the animated film The Rugrats Movie.  In 1994, she created a CD-ROM titled Puppet Motel, which was followed by Bright Red, co-produced by Brian Eno, and another spoken-word album, The Ugly One with the Jewels. This was followed by an appearance on the 1997 charity single "Perfect Day."

In 1996, Anderson performed with Diego Frenkel (La Portuária) and Aterciopelados for the AIDS benefit album Silencio=Muerte: Red Hot + Latin produced by the Red Hot Organization.

An interval of more than half a decade followed before her next album release. During this time, she wrote a supplemental article on the cultural character of New York City for the Encyclopædia Britannica and created a number of multimedia presentations, most notably one inspired by Moby-Dick (Songs and Stories from Moby Dick, 1999–2000). One of the central themes in Anderson's work is exploring the effects of technology on human relationships and communication.

Starting in the 1990s, Anderson and Lou Reed, whom she had met in 1992, collaborated on a number of recordings together. Reed contributed to the tracks "In Our Sleep" from Anderson's Bright Red, "One Beautiful Evening" from Anderson's Life on a String, and "My Right Eye" and "Only an Expert" from Anderson's Homeland, which Reed also co-produced. Anderson contributed to the tracks "Call on Me" from Reed's collaborative project The Raven, "Rouge" and "Rock Minuet" from Reed's Ecstasy, and "Hang On to Your Emotions" from Reed's Set the Twilight Reeling.

2000s 

Life on a String appeared in 2001, by which time she signed a new contract with another Warner Music label, Nonesuch Records. Life on a String was a mixture of new works (including one song recalling the death of her father) and works from the Moby Dick presentation. In 2001, she recorded the audiobook version of Don DeLillo's novel The Body Artist. Anderson went on tour performing a selection of her best-known musical pieces in 2001. One of these performances was recorded in New York City a week after the September 11, 2001, attacks, and included a performance of "O Superman." This concert was released in early 2002 as the double CD Live in New York.

In 2003, Anderson became NASA's first artist-in-residence, which inspired her performance piece The End of the Moon. She mounted a succession of themed shows and composed a piece for Expo 2005 in Japan. In 2005, Anderson visited Russia's space program—the Gagarin Cosmonaut Training Centre and mission control—with The Arts Catalyst and took part in The Arts Catalyst's Space Soon event at the Roundhouse to reflect on her experiences. She was part of the team that created the opening ceremony for the 2004 Olympic Games in Athens. Later that year, she collaborated with choreographer Trisha Brown and filmmaker Agnieszka Wojtowicz-Vosloo on the acclaimed multimedia project O Zlozony/O Composite for the Paris Opera Ballet. The ballet premiered at the Opera Garnier in Paris in December 2004.

In 2005, her exhibition The Waters Reglitterized opened at the Sean Kelly Gallery in New York City. According to the press release by Sean Kelly, the work is a diary of dreams and their literal recreation as works of art. This work, created in the process of re-experiencing or re-working her dreams while awake, uses the language of dreams to investigate the dream itself. The resulting pieces include drawings, prints, and high-definition video. The installation ran until October 22, 2005.

In 2006, Anderson was awarded a Residency at the American Academy in Rome. She narrated Ric Burns' Andy Warhol: A Documentary Film, which was first televised in September 2006 as part of the PBS American Masters series. She contributed a song to Plague Songs, a collection of songs related to the 10 Biblical plagues. Anderson also performed in Came So Far for Beauty, the Leonard Cohen tribute event held in the Point Theatre, Dublin, Ireland, on October 4–5, 2006. In November 2006, she published a book of drawings based on her dreams, titled Night Life.

Material from Homeland was performed at small work-in-progress shows in New York throughout May 2007, most notably at the Highline Ballroom on May 17–18, supported by a four-piece band with spontaneous lighting and video visuals mixed live throughout the performances by Willie Williams and Mark Coniglio, respectively. A European tour of the Homeland work in progress then took place, including performances on September 28–29, 2007, at the Olympia Theatre, Dublin; on October 17–19 at the Melbourne International Arts Festival; in Russia at the Moscow Dom Muzyky concert hall on April 26, 2008. The work was performed across the Atlantic in Toronto, Canada, on June 14, 2008, with husband Lou Reed, making the "Lost Art of Conversation" a duet with vocals and guitar, with his ambling style contrasting with Anderson's tightly wound performance. Anderson's Homeland Tour performed at several locations across the United States as well, such as at the Ferst Center for the Arts, Atlanta, Georgia; The Lincoln Center for the Performing Arts, New York City; and Harris Theater for Music and Dance in Millennium Park, Chicago, Illinois, co-presented by the Museum of Contemporary Art, Chicago.

2010s 

In February 2010, Laurie Anderson premiered a new theatrical work, titled Delusion, at the Vancouver 2010 Olympic Games.  This piece was commissioned by the Vancouver 2010 Cultural Olympiad and the Barbican Centre, London. Anderson was honored with the Women's Project Theater Woman of Achievement Award in March 2010. In May/June 2010, Anderson curated the Vivid Live festival in Sydney, Australia, together with Lou Reed. Her new album Homeland was released on June 22. She performed "Only an Expert" on July 15, 2010, on the Late Show with David Letterman, and her song "Gravity's Angel" was featured on the Fox TV show So You Think You Can Dance the same day. She appears as a guest musician on several tracks from experimental jazz musician Colin Stetson's 2011 album New History Warfare Vol. 2: Judges.

Anderson developed a theatrical work titled "Another Day in America." The first public showings of this work-in-progress took place in Calgary, Alberta, in January 2012 as part of Theatre Junction Grand's 2011–12 season and One Yellow Rabbit's annual arts festival, the High Performance Rodeo. Anderson was named the Inaugural Distinguished Artist-In-Residence at the Experimental Media and Performing Arts Center (EMPAC) at the Rensselaer Polytechnic Institute in Troy, New York, in May 2012. In March 2013, an exhibition of Anderson's work entitled Laurie Anderson: Language of the Future, selected works 1971-2013 at the Samstag Museum was part of the Adelaide Festival of the Arts in Adelaide, South Australia. Anderson performed her Duets on Ice outside the Samstag on opening night.

Anderson received the Honorary Doctor of Arts from the Aalto University School of Arts, Design and Architecture in 2013. In June/July 2013, Anderson performed "The Language of the Future" and guest curated at the River to River Festival in New York City. In November 2013, she was the featured Guest of Honor at the B3 Biennale of the Moving Image in Frankfurt, Germany. In 2018, Anderson contributed vocals to a re-recording of the David Bowie song "Shining Star (Makin' My Love)," originally from Bowie's 1987 album Never Let Me Down. She was asked to join the production by producer Mario J. McNulty, who knew that Anderson and Bowie had been friends.

On February 10, 2019, at the 61st Annual Grammy Awards, held in Los Angeles, Anderson and Kronos Quartet's Landfall won the Grammy Award for Best Chamber Music/Small Ensemble Performance. It was Anderson's first collaboration with Kronos Quartet and her first Grammy award, and was the second Grammy for Kronos. Inspired by her experience of Hurricane Sandy, Nonesuch Records said, "Landfall juxtaposes lush electronics and traditional strings by Kronos with Anderson's powerful descriptions of loss, from water-logged pianos to disappearing animal species to Dutch karaoke bars."

Chalkroom is a virtual reality work by Laurie Anderson and Taiwanese artist Hsin-Chien Huang in which the reader flies through an enormous structure made of words, drawings, and stories. To the Moon, a collaboration with Hsin-Chien Huang, premiered at the Manchester International Festival on July 12, 2019. A 15-minute virtual reality artwork, To the Moon allows audience members to explore a moon that features donkey rides and rubbish from Earth in a non-narrative structure. Alongside, a film shows the development of the new work.

2020s 
Laurie Anderson was appointed the 2021 Charles Eliot Norton Professor of Poetry at Harvard University and presented a series of six lectures titled Spending the War Without You: Virtual Backgrounds over the course of the spring and fall semesters.

In 2021, Anderson created a show on the second floor of the Hirshhorn Museum in Washington, D.C., titled "The Weather" and described by The New York Times as "a sort of nonretrospective retrospective of one of America’s major, and majorly confounding, modern artists."

Inventions 
Anderson has invented several experimental musical instruments that she has used in her recordings and performances.

Tape-bow violin 
The tape-bow violin is an instrument created by Laurie Anderson in 1977. It uses recorded magnetic tape in place of the traditional horsehair in the bow, and a magnetic tape head in the bridge. Anderson has updated and modified this device over the years. She can be seen using a later generation of this device in her film Home of the Brave during the Late Show segment in which she manipulates a sentence recorded by William S. Burroughs. This version of the violin used MIDI-based audio samples, triggered by contact with the bow.

Talking stick 
The talking stick is a six-foot-long baton-like MIDI controller. It was used in the Moby-Dick tour in 1999–2000. She described it in program notes as follows:

Voice filters 
A recurring motif in Anderson's work is the use of an electric pitch-shifting voice filter that deepens her voice into a masculine register, a technique that Anderson has referred to as "audio drag." Anderson has long used the resulting character in her work as a "voice of authority" or conscience, although she later decided that the voice had lost much of its authority and instead began using the voice to provide historical or sociopolitical commentary, as it is used on "Another Day in America," a piece from her 2010 album Homeland.

For much of Anderson's career, the voice was nameless or called the Voice of Authority, although as early as 2009 it was dubbed Fenway Bergamot at Lou Reed's suggestion. The cover of Homeland depicts Anderson in character as Bergamot, with streaks of black makeup to give her a moustache and thick, masculine eyebrows.

In "The Cultural Ambassador," a piece on her album The Ugly One with the Jewels, Anderson explained some of her perspective on the character:

Discography

Studio albums

Spoken word albums 
 The Ugly One with the Jewels (1995)
 Heart of a Dog (Soundtrack) (2015)

Live albums 
 United States Live (boxed set) (1984) US No. 192
 Live in New York (2002)

Compilation albums 
 Talk Normal: The Laurie Anderson Anthology (2000)

Audio book 
 The Body Artist by Don DeLillo (2001)

Collaborations 
 Airwaves (1977 ~ One Ten Records); various artists compilation including three tracks by Anderson
 You're the Guy I Want to Share My Money With with William S. Burroughs and John Giorno (1981 ~ Giorno Poetry Systems)
 "This Is the Picture (Excellent Birds)" with Peter Gabriel (1986, So ~ Geffen / Charisma)
 "Design For Living," with Nona Hendryx (1983), Nona, also with Gina Schock of The Go-Go's, Valerie Simpson of Ashford & Simpson, Tina Weymouth of Tom Tom Club and Talking Heads, Nancy Wilson of Heart, and former bandmate Patti LaBelle
 "Diva" from Zoolook by Jean Michel Jarre (1984 ~ Disques Dreyfus)
 "Speak My Language" (1993; Faraway, So Close! Soundtrack ~ SBK Records / ERG)
 A Chance Operation: The John Cage Tribute with text by John Cage (1993 ~ Koch International Classics)
 "Enquanto Isso" with Marisa Monte (1994, Verde, anil, amarelo, cor de rosa e carvão ~ EMI-Odeon) (1994, Rose and Charcoal ~ Blue Note Records)
 "Una hoja, una raiz (One Leaf, One Root)" with Diego Frenkel (La Portuária) and Aterciopelados (1996, Silencio=Muerte: Red Hot + Latin ~ H.O.L.A Records)
 "Je me souviens" by Jean Michel Jarre (2000, Métamorphoses ~ Sony Music)
 "Gentle Breeze" with Lou Reed (2004, Mary Had a Little Amp – a preschool education benefit CD ~ Epic)
 "The Fifth Plague (the Death of Livestock)" (2006, Plague Songs ~ 4AD)
 The Stone: Issue Three with John Zorn and Lou Reed (2008 ~ Tzadik)
 "The Electrician" (2009, Music Inspired by the Film Scott Walker: 30 Century Man ~ Lakeshore Records)
 Femina by John Zorn (2009 ~ Tzadik)
 New History Warfare Vol. 2: Judges by Colin Stetson (2011 ~ Constellation)
 "Rely on Me" with Jean Michel Jarre (2015, Electronica 1: The Time Machine ~ Columbia)
 Landfall (2018) (with Kronos Quartet) (BE #146, NL #186, PT #36)
 Songs from the Bardo (2019) (with Tenzin Choegyal and Jesse Paris Smith)

Singles 
 "O Superman" (1981) No. 28 AUS; No. 2 UK; BE (Vl) No. 19; IRL No. 11; NL No. 10; NZ No. 21
 "Big Science" (1981)
 "Sharkey's Day" (1984)
 "Language Is a Virus" (1986) No. 96 AUS;
 "Strange Angels" (1989)
 "Babydoll" (1989) No. 7 US Modern Rock
 "Beautiful Red Dress" (1990)
 "In Our Sleep" (1994)
 "Big Science 2" (2007) 
 "Mambo and Bling" (2008)
 "Only an Expert" (2010)

The single "Sharkey's Day" was for many years the theme song of Lifetime Television. Anderson also recorded a number of limited-release singles in the late 1970s (many issued from the Holly Soloman Gallery), songs from which were included on a number of compilations, including Giorno Poetry Systems' The Nova Convention and You're the Guy I Want to Share My Money With. Over the years she has performed on recordings by other musicians such as Peter Gabriel, Lou Reed, and Jean Michel Jarre. She also contributed lyrics to the Philip Glass album Songs from Liquid Days, and contributed a spoken-word piece to a tribute album in honor of John Cage.

Music videos 

Formal music videos have been produced for:
 "O Superman"
 "Sharkey's Day"
 "This Is the Picture (Excellent Birds)"
 "Language Is a Virus" (from Home of the Brave)
 "Beautiful Red Dress"

In addition, in lieu of making another music video for her Strange Angels album, Anderson taped a series of one- to two-minute "Personal Service Announcements" in which she spoke about issues such as the U.S. national debt and the arts scene. Some of the music used in these productions came from her soundtrack of Swimming to Cambodia. The PSAs were frequently shown between music videos on VH-1 in early 1990.

Films 

 Dearreader: How to Turn a Book Into a Movie – 1974
  – 1983
 Home of the Brave: A Film by Laurie Anderson – 1986
 What You Mean We? – 1987
 Hotel Deutschland – 1992
 The Rugrats Movie  – 1998 (as a character voice)
 Laurie Anderson: On Performance: ART/new york No. 54 – 2001 
 Life on a String – 2002
 Hidden Inside Mountains – 2006
 Heart of a Dog (2015)
 Feminists: What Were They Thinking? (2018)
 Sisters with Transistors (2020) - narrator

Digital media
 Puppet Motel (Macintosh CD-ROM, 1995) - collaboration with Hsin-Chien Huang.

Legacy 
In 2013, Dale Eisinger of Complex ranked United States as the third greatest work of performance art ever, with the writer arguing that Anderson is "able to ascertain just exactly the climate of life in the United States, without being so punctuated that it causes a standoff. Perhaps the zenith of this configuration was her multimedia performance, 'United States I – IV.' [...] [Anderson displays] her vast, incisive range of talents on the 'United States Live' recordings."

Awards and nominations 
{| class="wikitable sortable plainrowheaders" 
|-
! scope="col" | Award
! scope="col" | Year
! scope="col" | Nominee(s)
! scope="col" | Category
! scope="col" | Result
! scope="col" class="unsortable"| 
|-
!scope="row"|Adelaide Film Festival
| 2015
| rowspan=5|Heart of a Dog
| rowspan=2|Best Documentary 
| 
| rowspan=5|
|-
!scope="row"|Chicago International Film Festival
| 2015
| 
|-
!scope="row" rowspan=3|Cinema Eye Honors Awards
| rowspan=3|2016
| Outstanding Achievement in Original Music Score
| 
|-
| Outstanding Achievement in Direction
| 
|-
| Outstanding Achievement in Graphic Design or Animation
| 
|-
!scope="row"|Deutsche Schallplatten Prize
| 2001
| Life on a String
| Deutsche Schallplatten Prize
| 
| 
|-
!scope="row"|Faro Island Film Festival
| rowspan=1|2015
| rowspan=2|Heart of a Dog
| rowspan=1|Best Documentary 
| 
| rowspan=2|
|-
!scope="row"|Film Independent Spirit Awards
| 2016
| Best Documentary Feature
| 
|-
!scope="row"|Edison Awards
| 1983
| Big Science
| Extra International 
| 
| 
|-
!scope="row" rowspan=5|Grammy Awards
| 1985
| "Gravity's Angel"
| Best Instrumental Arrangement Accompanying Vocal(s)
| 
| rowspan=5|
|-
| 1991
| Strange Angels
| Best Alternative Music Performance
| 
|-
| 2011
| "Flow"
| Best Pop Instrumental Performance
| 
|-
| 2019
| "Landfall"
| Best Chamber Music/Small Ensemble Performance
| 
|-
| 2021
| Songs from the Bardo
| Best New Age Album
| 
|-
!scope="row" rowspan=2|Gotham Awards
| rowspan=2|2015
| rowspan=3| Heart of a Dog
| Best Documentary
| 
|rowspan=4|
|-
| Audience Award
| 
|-
!scope="row"|La Roche-sur-Yon International Film Festival
| 2015
| Prix Nouvelles Vagues Acuitis
| 
|-
!scope="row" rowspan=3|Locarno International Film Festival
| 2005
| rowspan=1|Hidden Inside Mountains
| Golden Leopard - Video
| 
|-
| 2015
| Herself
| Lifetime Achievement Award
| 
| 
|-
| 2022
| Herself
| Vision Award Ticinomoda
| 
| 
|-
!scope="row"|Tenco Prize
| 2001
| Herself
| Tenco Prize for Songwriting 
| 
| 
|-
!scope="row"|Tribeca Film Festival
| 2006
| Hidden Inside Mountains
| Best Narrative Short
| 
|rowspan=5|
|-
!scope="row"|Tromsø International Film Festival
| 2016
| rowspan=4|Heart of a Dog
| Aurora Award
| 
|-
!scope="row" rowspan=3|Venice Film Festival
| rowspan=3|2015
| Lina Mangiacapre Award
| 
|-
| Golden Lion
| 
|-
| Green Drop Award
| 
|-
!scope="row"|Wolf Prize
| 2017
| Herself
| Award for Art
| 
|

Television 
 Bei Bio – musical guest on German TV show, 1984
 The New Show – musical guest, 1984
 Saturday Night Live – musical guest, 1986 
 Alive from Off Center – host, 1987
  Space Ghost Coast to Coast  – guest 1996 
 Late Show with David Letterman – guest 2010

Audiobooks 
 The Path to Tranquility by His Holiness the Dalai Lama – co-narrator, 1999
 The Body Artist by Don DeLillo – sole narrator, 2001
 Nothing in My Pockets – two-part sound diary recorded in 2003, orig. 2006 French radio broadcast, booklet with text and photography (Dis Voir, 2009)  (also published in French)

Bibliography 
 United States (HarperCollins, 1984) 
 Empty Places (A Performance) (Harper Perennial, 1991) 
 Stories from the Nerve Bible: A Twenty-Year Retrospective (HarperCollins, 1994) 
 Dal vivo (Fondazione Prada, 1999) 
 Night Life (Edition 7L, 2007) 
 All the Things I Lost in the Flood (Rizzoli Electa, 2018)

Personal life
She moved to New York in 1966 and now lives in Tribeca. Anderson was the romantic partner of fellow musician Lou Reed for 21 years. They were married in 2008 and remained together for the following five years until his death of liver cancer.

References

Further reading 
 Golden, Barbara. "Conversation with Laurie Anderson". eContact! 12.2 – Interviews (2) (April 2010). Montréal: CEC.
 Mutant, Mite. "Talking with Laurie Anderson". Mutant Renegade Zine #7, June 1996.
 Nicom, John. "Homeland insecurity: Laurie Anderson takes uncompromising look at how America has changed". LJWorld.com. September 12, 2008.

External links 

 
 
 
 Some Notes on Seeing: The Waters Reglitterized By Laurie Anderson for exhibition 2005
 
 
 Guardian interview.
 A Life of Storytelling. An interview with Laurie Anderson, 2016 Video by Louisiana Channel
 SoundCloud - Hear the world’s sounds with Georgina Godwin
 Advice to Young Artists. An interview with Laurie Anderson, 2016 Video by Louisiana Channel
 Laurie Anderson on Self-Playing Violin, MoMA Audio
 A Trip to the Moon. An interview with Laurie Anderson & Hsin-Chien Huang, 2018 Video by Louisiana Channel
 60 Minutes profile, April 3, 2022

1947 births
20th-century American composers
20th-century American singers
20th-century American women artists
20th-century American women singers
21st-century American composers
21st-century American singers
21st-century American women artists
21st-century American women singers
American avant-garde musicians
American experimental musicians
20th-century American inventors
American multimedia artists
American performance artists
American spoken word poets
American video artists
American women film directors
American women performance artists
American women poets
American women video artists
Art pop musicians
Art rock musicians
Artists from New York (state)
Avant-garde singers
Barnard College alumni
Columbia University School of the Arts alumni
Experimental composers
Experimental pop musicians
Living people
Lou Reed
Mills College alumni
Nonesuch Records artists
People from Glen Ellyn, Illinois
Performance art in New York City
Singers from Illinois
Warner Records artists
Wolf Prize in Arts laureates
American women in electronic music
Women inventors
Film directors from Illinois
Electric violinists
21st-century American violinists
American experimental filmmakers
People from Tribeca
Women experimental filmmakers
20th-century women composers
21st-century women composers
Elektra Records artists